Deepa Fernandes  is one of the hosts of NPR's Here and Now. She has formerly hosted the WBAI radio program Wakeup Call and the nationally syndicated Pacifica radio news show Free Speech Radio News on the politically independent, anti-war Pacifica Radio Network. Fernandes has worked as a freelance producer for the British Broadcasting Corporation, the Australian Broadcasting Corporation, InterWorld Radio and Pacifica Radio.

Biography
Born in Mumbai, India, to parents of Goan descent, Fernandes began her career in journalism in Sydney, Australia, working as a daily news reporter. She then moved to Latin America, where she worked on a 26-part radio documentary series on indigenous communities in Ecuador. From there she went to Cuba to work as a daily features producer at Radio Havana Cuba.

Fernandes next moved to New York City, where she went to work as a producer for the flagship Pacifica Radio program, Democracy Now!. At Pacifica's WBAI she co-produced Our Americas, a weekly radio program on issues affecting Latin America and the Caribbean, and hosted the weekday morning show, Wakeup Call. She also has been a co-anchor for Pacifica's national daily news program, Free Speech Radio News.

In January 2007, Fernandes spoke with Democracy Now's Amy Goodman about her new book, Targeted: National Security and the Business of Immigration, published by Seven Stories Press. She told Goodman that she "got into secondary inspection rooms around the country, because I had to, because I was coming in the country and I was processed through there."

In 2012, Fernandes was a Knight Fellow at Stanford University. In 2013 Fernandes joined the staff of NPR member station KPCC in Pasadena, California.  She covers a newly established beat on Early Childhood Development.

Fernandes holds an MA from Columbia Journalism School. Her sister, Sujatha, is an assistant professor of sociology at Queens College in New York City.

References

External links
Wakeup Call
Free Speech Radio News
Deepa Fernandes' biography
The Iran Project: Biography on Deepa Fernandes
Targeted: National Security and the Business of Immigration Seven Stories Press
Deepa Fernandes on Democracy Now! January 25th, 2007
Deepa Fernandes on NPR
Deepa Fernandes interviewed on F.A.I.R's CounterSpin

American alternative journalists
American radio journalists
American writers of Indian descent
American political writers
Date of birth missing (living people)
Living people
Pacifica Foundation people
American people of Goan descent
Indian emigrants to the United States
20th-century American journalists
21st-century American journalists
American women radio journalists
Year of birth missing (living people)
20th-century American women
21st-century American women